Doğanyol is a village in the Beytüşşebap District of Şırnak Province in Turkey. The village is populated by Kurds of the Gewdan tribe and had a population of 13 in 2021.

The two hamlets of Erler and Geçitli are attached to Doğanyol.

References 

Villages in Beytüşşebap District
Kurdish settlements in Şırnak Province